The Road to Escondido  is a collaborative studio album by J. J. Cale and Eric Clapton. It was released on 7 November 2006. Contained on this album are the final recordings of keyboardist Billy Preston. The album is jointly dedicated to Preston and Brian Roylance.

In 2004, Eric Clapton held the Crossroads Guitar Festival, a three-day festival in Dallas, Texas. Among the performers was J. J. Cale, giving Clapton the opportunity to ask Cale to produce an album for him. The two started working together and eventually decided to record an album. A number of high-profile musicians also agreed to work on the album, including Billy Preston, Derek Trucks, Taj Mahal, Pino Palladino, John Mayer, Steve Jordan, and Doyle Bramhall II. In a coup, whether intended or not, the entire John Mayer Trio participated on this album in one capacity or another.

Escondido is a city in San Diego County near Cale's home at the time located in the small, unincorporated town of Valley Center, California. Eric Clapton owned a mansion in Escondido in the 1980s and early '90s. The road referenced in the album's title is named Valley Center Road. It runs from Valley Center to Escondido. Cale and Clapton thought it would be a good name for the album because it connected the two locales.

The album won the Grammy Award for Best Contemporary Blues Album in 2008.

Background
Cale first came into Clapton's orbit in the late sixties when he heard Cale's obscure 1966 Liberty single "Slow Motion", which featured "After Midnight" as the B-side. Clapton copied the arrangement of "After Midnight" and scored a radio hit with it in 1970. Cale, who worked for a time as an engineer in Leon Russell's home studio in Los Angeles for a few years, was barely making ends meet in Tulsa when the song became a hit. Cale recalled to Mojo magazine that when he heard Clapton's version playing on his radio, "I was dirt poor, not making enough to eat and I wasn't a young man. I was in my thirties, so I was very happy. It was nice to make some money." Clapton then recorded other Cale songs, such as the 1977 hit "Cocaine", and the songwriting royalties earned from artists like Clapton covering his songs enabled Cale to have a comfortable, if not commercially successful, recording career. In a 2014 interview with NPR, Clapton spoke about Cale's influence on his music:

Clapton, who toured with Delaney & Bonnie in 1969, recalled in the 2005 documentary To Tulsa and Back, "Delaney Bramlett is the one that was responsible to get me singing. He was the one who turned me on to the Tulsa community. Bramlett produced my first solo album and "After Midnight" was on it, and those [Tulsa] players played on it. I mean, the first part of my solo career was really tailored on Cale's philosophy. I mean, 461 Ocean Boulevard was my kind of homage to J.J."

Despite their association in the public's mind, the pair had rarely socialized or played together over the years, but in 2004 Clapton invited Cale to perform at his Crossroads Festival in Dallas. Cale, who was coming off an eight-year hiatus with the release of To Tulsa and Back, accepted, and it was during this period that Clapton asked him to produce his next album, which blossomed into a full-fledged collaboration.

Recording
Cale wrote 11 of the 14 tracks on the album, with two cuts, "Any Way the Wind Blows" and "Don't Cry Sister", being re-recordings of songs that Cale recorded previously in the seventies. Vocally, the pair's singing styles are so symbiotic on the album that they are nearly indistinguishable, with Stephen Thomas Erlewine observing in his AllMusic review that the LP "reveals exactly how much Clapton learned from Cale's singing; their timbre and phrasing is nearly identical, to the point that it's frequently hard to discern who is singing when. Disconcerting this may be, but it's hardly bad, since it never feels like Clapton is copying Cale; instead, it shows their connection, that they're kindred spirits." Musically the tone is relaxed and casual, a mix of bluesy grooves and up-tempo boogies that play to the duo's strengths. The fiddle-driven "Dead End Road", the galloping "Any Way the Wind Blows", and the optimistic "Ride the River" exude the general vibe of camaraderie that permeates the recordings, while Clapton's "Three Little Girls" speaks to the bliss of domestic life. The Brownie McGhee cover "The Sporting Life" and the seen-it-all minor blues "Hard to Thrill" (composed by Clapton and John Mayer) display the pair's tasteful guitar licks and vocals.

Reception
AllMusic: "It's relaxed and casual in the best possible sense: it doesn't sound lazy, it sounds lived-in, even with [Simon] Climie's too-clean production, and that vibe - coupled with Cale's sturdy songs - makes this an understated winner." David Fricke of Rolling Stone wrote the LP "has the natural glow and nimble jump of a house-party jam."

Track listing
All songs by J. J. Cale except where noted.

 "Danger" – 5:34
 "Heads in Georgia" – 4:12
 "Missing Person" – 4:26
 "When This War Is Over" – 3:49
 "Sporting Life Blues" (Brownie McGhee) – 3:31
 "Dead End Road" – 3:30
 "It's Easy" – 4:19
 "Hard to Thrill" (Eric Clapton, John Mayer) – 5:11
 "Anyway the Wind Blows" – 3:56
 "Three Little Girls" (Clapton) – 2:44
 "Don't Cry Sister" – 3:10
 "Last Will and Testament" – 3:57
 "Who Am I Telling You?" – 4:08
 "Ride the River" – 4:35

Personnel

Musicians

J. J. Cale: guitars, keyboards, vocals
Eric Clapton: guitars, vocals
Derek Trucks: guitar
John Mayer: guitar
Albert Lee: guitar
Doyle Bramhall II: guitar
Christine Lakeland: acoustic guitar, backing vocals
Nathan East: bass guitar
Gary Gilmore: bass guitar
Willie Weeks: bass guitar
Pino Palladino: bass guitar
Jim Karstein: drums, percussion
James Cruce: drums, percussion
Steve Jordan: drums
Abe Laboriel Jr.: drums
Simon Climie: percussion, programming
David Teegarden: percussion
Billy Preston: Hammond organ, Fender Rhodes, Wurlitzer
Walt Richmond: acoustic piano, Wurlitzer, Fender Rhodes
Taj Mahal: harmonica
Dennis Caplinger: fiddle
Bruce Fowler: horns
Marty Grebb: horns
Steve Madaio: horns
Jerry Peterson: horns

Production 

Eric Clapton: producer, album cover concept
J. J. Cale: producer, mixing
Simon Climie: co-producer, Pro Tools engineering
Alan Douglas: recording engineer, mixing
Brian Vibberts: assistant engineer
Jimmy Hoyson: assistant engineer
Phillippe Rose: assistant engineer
Mick Guzauski: mixing
Tom Bender: mix assistant
Joel Evenden: Pro Tools assistant
Bob Ludwig: mastering at Gateway Mastering (Portland, ME).
Bushbranch: management for Eric Clapton
Mike Kappus: management for J. J. Cale
Lee Dickson: guitar technician
Debbie Johnson: studio coordinator (Los Angeles).
Catherine Roylance: art direction and design
David McClister: location photography
Nathan East: additional studio photography
Christine Lakeland: additional studio photography
Jim Karstein: additional studio photography
Nigel Carroll: personal assistant to Eric Clapton, additional studio photography

Chart performance

Weekly charts

Year-end charts

Certifications

References

External links
 J.J. Cale official website
 Eric Clapton official website
 Review on Modern Guitars Magazine

2006 albums
Eric Clapton albums
Grammy Award for Best Contemporary Blues Album
J. J. Cale albums
Reprise Records albums